Obalufon Ogbogbodirin was the 4th Ooni of Ife, a paramount traditional ruler of Ile Ife, the ancestral home of the Yorubas. He succeeded Ooni Ogun and was succeeded by his son, Ooni Obalufon Alayemore. He lived for over 500 years, and after reigning for centuries, he was transformed into a deity.

References

Oonis of Ife
Yoruba history